A changeling is a figure in West European folklore.

Changeling, The Changeling, or The Changelings may also refer to:

Books
 The Changeling (The Fey), a 1996 novel by Kristine Kathryn Rusch
 The Changelings (novel), 1955, by Jo Sinclair
 The Changeling (Ōe novel), 2000
 The Changeling (play), 1622, by Thomas Middleton and William Rowley
 The Changeling (LaValle novel), a 2017 novel by Victor LaValle
 The Changeling (Snyder novel), 1970
 The Changeling (Williams novel), 2008
 Changeling (Mike Oldfield autobiography)
 Changeling (novel), 1980, by Roger Zelazny
 The Changelings: A Classical Japanese Court Tale or Torikaebaya Monogatari
 Animorphs or The Changelings, a young adult book series by K. A. Applegate
 The Changeling, an 1898 novel by Sir Walter Besant
 The Changeling, a 1942–1944 serialized science fiction novel by A. E. van Vogt
 The Changeling, a 1958 novel by Robin Jenkins
 Changeling, a 1989 novel by Stephen Leigh in the Isaac Asimov's Robots and Aliens series
 The Changeling, a 1995 novel by Terri Windling
 Changeling, a 2006 novel by Delia Sherman
 Changeling, a novel by Steve Feasey, shortlisted for the 2009 Waterstones Children's Book Prize
 Changeling, a novel by Philippa Gregory

Comics
 Changeling (Marvel Comics) or Kevin Sydney, a shapeshifter
 Changeling (DC Comics) or Beast Boy, a shapeshifting superhero
 Changeling, a manga by Shio Satō

Film and television
 Changeling (film), a 2008 American drama
 Changeling (soundtrack), soundtrack album based on the film
 The Changeling (TV drama), a 1974 British production of the 1622 Middleton & Rowley play
 The Changeling (film), a 1980 Canadian horror film
 "The Changeling" (Star Trek: The Original Series), a 1967 television episode
 Changeling (Star Trek), a fictional race of shapeshifters
 Changelings, a reformed villain species from My Little Pony: Friendship Is Magic
 "The Changeling" (Stargate SG-1), a television episode
 "Changelings" (Once Upon a Time), a television episode
 "The Changeling", a season 7 episode of The Waltons
 Changelings, a proposed TV series based on the Tara Bray Smith novel Betwixt
"The Changeling" , an episode in series 3 of the BBC series Merlin

Gaming
 Changeling: The Dreaming, a role-playing game published in the 1990s
 Changeling: The Lost, a role-playing game published in 2007
 Changeling (Dungeons & Dragons), a player character race

Music
 Changeling (album), 2012, by Camille O'Sullivan
 The Changeling (album), 1982, by Toyah
 "Changeling" (song), a 2013 song by Alison Moyet
 "The Changeling" (song), a 1971 song by the Doors
 "Changeling", a song by DJ Shadow from Endtroducing.....
 "Changeling", a song by Madder Mortem from Desiderata
 "Changeling", a song by Simple Minds from Real to Real Cacophony

See also
Changling (disambiguation)
Shapeshifting, mythical ability of a being or creature to transform its physical form or shape